Gowd Chah (also Romanized as Gowd Chāh) is a village in Qasabeh-ye Gharbi Rural District, in the Central District of Sabzevar County, Razavi Khorasan Province, Iran. At the 2006 census, its population was 12, in 6 families.

References 

Populated places in Sabzevar County